
Gmina Kuryłówka is a rural gmina (administrative district) in Leżajsk County, Subcarpathian Voivodeship, in south-eastern Poland.

Villages
Gmina Kuryłówka contains the villages and settlements of Brzyska Wola, Dąbrowica, Jastrzębiec, Kolonia Polska, Kulno, Kuryłówka, Ożanna, Słoboda, Tarnawiec and Wólka Łamana.

Neighbouring gminas
Gmina Kuryłówka is bordered by the town of Leżajsk and by the gminas of Adamówka, Biszcza, Krzeszów, Leżajsk, Potok Górny and Tarnogród.

Notable persons
Moe Drabowsky, American major league baseball pitcher

References

Polish official population figures 2006

Kurylowka
Leżajsk County